SM Center Angono is a shopping mall owned by SM Prime Holdings, the largest mall developer in the Philippines. It is located along Manila East Road, Angono, Rizal. This mall which opened to the public on 14 November 2014 is the 50th SM Supermall in the Philippines, the second along Manila East Road after SM City Taytay and third in Rizal Province after SM City Taytay and SM City Masinag. It is also the first SM Center to anchor Savemore Market rather than anchoring the Hypermarket. It was succeeded the following year by another SM Supermall also in Rizal, SM City San Mateo.

Planning 
SM in building its new mall in the Arts Capital of the Philippines is in line to the first class urban municipality's vision of becoming Angonopolis in the future. The mall is expected to kick start this goal of the town's potential role in employment, income and quality of life in it.

Its groundbreaking is held on 5 August 2013 which is expected to hire about 2,000 employees.

Mall features 
It has its own rainwater holding tank in which its purpose is to help prevent floods in the community by collecting and holding 1,600 cubic meters of rainwater. Another of its disaster resilient feature is the expansion joints for mitigating earthquake damage.

References

Shopping malls in Rizal
Angono
Shopping malls established in 2014